Alsény Camara Agogo (born 4 January 1995 in Kamsar) is a Guinean footballer who plays for HUS Agadir on loan from AS Kaloum and for the Guinea national team. He plays centre forward.

International career

International goals
Scores and results list Guinea's goal tally first.

References

External links

Living people
Guinean footballers
1995 births
Association football forwards
AS Kaloum Star players
Hassania Agadir players
Horoya AC players
Guinée Championnat National players
Botola players
Guinean expatriate footballers
Guinean expatriate sportspeople in Morocco
Expatriate footballers in Morocco
People from Boké Region
Guinea international footballers
Guinea A' international footballers
2016 African Nations Championship players